Vasyl Ivanovych Folvarochnyi (30 January 1941 – 5 February 2022) was a Ukrainian novelist, poet and journalist. He was a Merited Figure of Arts of Ukraine.

Life and career 
After the university he started working for the newspaper  (Молодий буковинець/Molodyi Bukovynets).

A member of Komsomol and later of the National Writers' Union of Ukraine, Folvarochny wrote dozens of novels, collections of short stories, poems and essays. During his life he was the recipient of several awards and accolades, including the title of Merited Figure of Arts of Ukraine, the Order of Saints Cyril and Methodius, and the title of Commander of the Order of Merit of Ukraine. He died on 5 February 2022, at the age of 81.

References

External links
 

1941 births
2022 deaths
Soviet writers
Ukrainian writers
Soviet journalists
Ukrainian journalists
Recipients of the title of Merited Artist of Ukraine
Soviet poets
Ukrainian poets
People from Ternopil Oblast
Chernivtsi University alumni
University of Lviv alumni